Justice Wilder may refer to:

Arthur A. Wilder (1873–1917), associate justice of the Supreme Court of Hawaii
Horace Wilder (1802–1889), associate justice of the Supreme Court of Ohio
Kurtis T. Wilder (born 1959), associate justice of the Michigan Supreme Court